The 1999 Hel van het Mergelland was the 27th edition of the Volta Limburg Classic cycle race and was held on 10 April 1999. The race started and finished in Eijsden. The race was won by Raymond Meijs.

General classification

References

1999
1999 in road cycling
1999 in Dutch sport
April 1999 sports events in Europe